Elena Rastello (born 13 December 1958) is a former Italian female middle-distance runner and cross-country runner who competed at individual senior level at the World Athletics Cross Country Championships (1979).

References

External links
 

1958 births
Living people
Italian female middle-distance runners
Italian female cross country runners
20th-century Italian women
21st-century Italian women